Waiting for Summer is a 2012 Canadian drama film directed by Senthil Vinu and starring Caleb Verzyden and Virginia Leigh. It was produced by Krzysztof Pietroszek. The film was released on March 30, 2012, at the Canadian Film Fest in Toronto, Canada and won the 2012 Film North Best Feature Award at the Film North – Huntsville International Film Festival.

Cast
 Caleb Verzyden as Zach
 Virginia Leigh as Chantal

References

External links
 

2012 films
Canadian drama films
English-language Canadian films
Films set in Toronto
Films shot in Toronto
2010s English-language films
2010s Canadian films